Rodding may refer to:

 Use of drain rods
 The town of Rødding in Denmark
 Operating hot rods